

Players

Competitions

Division Four

League table

Results summary

League position by match

Matches

FA Cup

Littlewoods Cup

Freight Rover Trophy

Appearances and goals

Transfers

Transfers in

Loans in

Transfers out

Loans out

References

Books

1986-87
Northampton Town
Northampton Town